WIPI may refer to:
 World Intellectual Property Indicators, an annual statistical report published by the World Intellectual Property Organization
 WIPI (platform), Wireless Internet Platform for Interoperability, a middleware platform used in South Korea
 Wipi language, a Papuan language of New Guinea
 WIPI protein family, an evolutionarily conserved family of proteins